Todd Bradley Hlushko (born February 7, 1970) is a Canadian former professional ice hockey left winger. He is currently the Director of Player Development/Director of Pro Scouting for German team Adler Mannheim.

Hlushko played in the National Hockey League (NHL) for the Philadelphia Flyers, Calgary Flames and Pittsburgh Penguins. He played with the Canadian national team and was a member of Canada's silver medal-winning team at the 1994 Winter Olympics and bronze medal squad at the 1995 World Championship.

Playing career
Hlushko played with three teams in three seasons in his junior hockey career.  He began with the Guelph Jr. B's in 1987–88 where he scored 36 goals and 83 points in 44 games.  He moved up to the Ontario Hockey League (OHL) the following season where he recorded 46 points. A 70-point season followed in 1989–90 where he split the campaign with the relocated Owen Sound Platers and the London Knights. Though the NHL Central Scouting Bureau had Hlushko rated as a potential sixth round pick at the 1990 NHL Entry Draft, he was not selected until the 12th round.  The Washington Capitals drafted him with the 240th overall pick; only 12 players were selected after him.

The Capitals assigned Hluskho to their American Hockey League (AHL) affiliate, the Baltimore Skipjacks.  He played two seasons in Baltimore, recording 23 points in 1990–91 then improving to 51 points in 1991–92. Hlushko left the Capitals organization in 1992 to join the Canadian national team in the hopes of playing at the 1994 Winter Olympics. He toured with the national team for two seasons, scoring 44 goals in 113 games combined, He made the Olympic team and recorded five goals in eight games, including two in a victory over France. Canada reached the gold medal game, but were forced to settle for the silver medal by Sweden, who won 3–2 in a shootout.

Immediately following the Olympics, Hlushko signed a contract with the Philadelphia Flyers for the remainder of the 1993–94 season. He was assigned to the AHL's Hershey Bears where he scored six goals in nine games, but was also recalled to play two games with the Flyers.  Hlushko made his NHL debut on March 10, 1994, against the Ottawa Senators and scored his first goal on March 13 against the Tampa Bay Lightning. The Flyers allowed Hlushko to go to free agency following the season, and he was signed by the Calgary Flames.  He spent the majority of the 1994–95 season with the AHL's Saint John Flames where he recorded 22 goals in 46 games, but appeared in two regular season contests with Calgary and made his NHL playoff debut. Hlishko also played in the 1995 World Championship where he scored four goals in eight games to help Canada win the bronze medal.

The 1995–96 season was similar as Hlushko appeared in only four NHL games with the Flames; he played 35 with Saint John and missed 25 games due to a shoulder injury. In 1996–97, he played his only full season in the NHL. Hlushko appeared in 58 games for Calgary and recorded seven goals and 11 assists. He was again relegated to Saint John for the majority of 1997–98. Following the season, Hlushko was traded. On June 17, 1998, he was sent, along with German Titov, to the Pittsburgh Penguins in exchange for Ken Wregget and Dave Roche. Hlushko was again assigned to the minor leagues. He spent the 1998–99 season with the Grand Rapids Griffins of the International Hockey League (IHL) where he had 24 goals and 50 points. He was recalled to Pittsburgh during the 1999 Stanley Cup Playoffs and appeared in two games.

Following the season, Hlushko moved to Europe where he played six seasons in the German Deutsche Eishockey Liga and represented Canada in smaller tournaments. He returned to Canada in 2006 where, after playing two seasons of senior hockey with the Dundas Real McCoys, Hlushko retired as a player.

Post-playing career 
Hlushko worked as a host and analyst for Sportsnet.

In May 2019, Adler Mannheim of the Deutsche Eishockey Liga (DEL) appointed Hlushko as scout and team representative for North America.

Career statistics

Regular season and playoffs

International

References
Career statistics:

External links
 

1970 births
Adler Mannheim players
Baltimore Skipjacks players
Calgary Flames players
Canadian ice hockey left wingers
Grand Rapids Griffins (IHL) players
Guelph Platers players
Hannover Scorpions players
Hershey Bears players
Ice hockey people from Ontario
Ice hockey players at the 1994 Winter Olympics
Kölner Haie players
Living people
London Knights players
Olympic ice hockey players of Canada
Olympic medalists in ice hockey
Olympic silver medalists for Canada
Owen Sound Platers players
Philadelphia Flyers players
Pittsburgh Penguins players
Saint John Flames players
Sportspeople from Guelph
Washington Capitals draft picks
Medalists at the 1994 Winter Olympics
Canadian expatriate ice hockey players in Germany